Nils-Aslak Valkeapää, known as Áillohaš in the Northern Sami language (23 March 1943 – 26 November 2001), was a Finnish Sami writer, musician and artist. He was born in Enontekiö in Lapland province, Finland. He lived most of his life in Käsivarsi, close to the border of Sweden, and also in Skibotn in Norway. Valkeapää was born to a family of traditional reindeer herders, but was trained as a school teacher. His most well-known international debut was when he performed at the opening ceremony of the 1994 Winter Olympic Games in Lillehammer, Norway. He received the Nordic Council Literature Prize for The Sun, My Father in 1991.

Works
Nils-Aslak Valkeapää expressed himself through several art forms, and was known as a multimedia artist. With reference to this, he used to say that it was impossible for him to decide which expression came to him first; the poem, the joik (anglicised spelling is yoik to reflect the pronunciation) or the pictures.

His first publication was the artistic and political pamphlet Terveisiä Lapista (1971) (English title: Greetings from Lapland), which was published in Finnish. He later published nine collections of poetry. He was awarded The Nordic Council Literature Prize in 1991 for the book called Beaivi, áhčážan (English title: The Sun, My Father). His poems have been translated into a number of languages, including English, German, French, Japanese, Faroese, Norwegian and Swedish. His poetry is described as being close to nature and genuine, and it is often referred to as an expression of indigenous peoples' way of thinking and worldview. Valkeapää also wrote a play, Ridn'oaivi ja Nieguid oaidni (English title: The Frost-haired and the Dream-seer). The play was inspired by the Japanese theatre tradition of Noh and given its first performance in Japan in 1995.

His paintings are often based on Sami mythological beings, whereas birds, people and reindeer are often depicted in his pencil drawings. Valkeapää was an outstanding photographer, which is reflected in several of his published books. He also made sculptures of processed wooden logs, drift timber and animal bones. He donated 30 works of art to Kautokeino municipality. This collection is on permanent display at Guovdageainnu gilišillju (or Kautokeino open-air museum).

Valkeapää was a central person in the revitalisation of the traditional Sami yoik. He was first recognised as an artist for his joik during the 1960s, with his first recording Joikuja from 1968, which contained modernised joik. Several of his publications can be termed yoik compositions. He was behind 14 music releases in his lifetime, and was awarded the Prix Italia for his composition Goase dušše (English title: The Bird Symphony) in 1993. As time went by, the yoik "Sámi eatnan duoddariid" (English roughly: Sami plains) (originally released on the album Sápmi lottážan (English:  Sápmi, my Dear Little Bird) in 1979) achieved classic status among the Sami people. The yoik was designated national yoik on the 22nd Saami Conference, which took place in Váhtjer (Gällivare, Sweden) in 2022. 

In the 1987 Oscar nominated film Ofelaš (English title: Pathfinder), Valkeapää played the part of the siiddaisit (head of the siida, a small Sami society). He also composed the music for the film. In the TV series Son of the Sun and Daughter of the Moon, he played the part of the shaman Agimiela. In addition, he had a part in the radio theatre performance Dola fámuin (English roughly: With the Power of Fire).

Nils-Aslak Valkeapää was central in establishing Sami Authors' Union and also in helping performing artists to have their own union. For a period, he was the culture coordinator for the World Council of Indigenous peoples (WCIP). He was behind what was called the world's first culture festival for i Indigenous peoples, Davvi Šuvva, in Karesuando in 1979, as well as when the festival was held again in 1992.

Valkeapää was a mentor, publisher and inspirator of many young yoikers and writers. In 1984 he was the driving force behind establishing the Sami Publisher DAT, which has later published most of his books and music. He was himself the editor of several books published by DAT.

He earned a lot of recognition for his work, and was appointed honorary doctor of the University of Oulu in 1994 and the University of Lapland in Rovaniemi in 1996. In 1995 he was awarded the honorary order of the White Star of the Republic of Estonia. 

Nils-Aslak Valkeapää died in his sleep in Espoo on 26 November 2001.

Posthumous publication of Nils-Aslak Valkeapää's work includes two poems included on his godson Niko Valkeapää's eponymous début album. An article published by the Music Information Center Norway stated, "In his trademark, understated style, Niko composes melodies that weave their way into and out of his godfather’s words. Nils Aslak Valkeapää was one of the foremost exponents of Sami art and culture through his long and distinguished career as a poet, composer and artist. Says Niko on his godfather’s influence: 'I can’t deny that Nils Aslak was a role model for me – he was a figure that I would look up to. He has been a source of inspiration and I have included two of his poems on my album to pay homage to him.”

A recording of Nils-Aslak Valkeapää performing his joik (for the soundtrack of Pathfinder film) forms the centrepiece of "Prayer for the Earth", a track on The Songs of Distant Earth, the 1994 album by British musician Mike Oldfield.

Personal life 
Valkeapää was bisexual, but hid his sexuality throughout his life.

Discography 
 Joikuja (1968)
 Juoigamat (1973)
 Vuoi Biret-Maaret, vuoi! (1974)
  De čábba niegut runiidit (1976)
 Duvva, Áilen Niga Elle ja Aillohaš (1976)
 Sámi eatnan duoddariid (1978)
 Sápmi, vuoi Sápmi! (1982)
  Davás ja geassái (1982)
  Beaivi, áhčážan (1988)
  Eanan, eallima eadni (1990)
  Sámi luondu, gollerisku (1992)
  Goase dušše (1994)
  Dálveleaikkat / Wintergames (1994)

Written works

Poems

Eanni, eannázan (2001) 
Girddán, seivvodan (1999) 
The Sun, My Father (1997) 
In the shadow of midnight sun. Contemporary Sámi prose and poetry (1997) 
Jus gaccebiehtár bohkosivccii (1996)
Nu guhkkin dat mii lahka: så fjernt det naere (1994) 
Trekways of the Wind (1994) Univ of Arizona Press, 
Aurinko, isäni (1992) Ulkomainen Kirjallisuus, 
Fadir min, solin (1992)
Solen, min far (1990)
Vindens veier (1990)
Beaivi áhcázan (1988)
Vidderna inom mig (1987)
Ich bin des windigen Berges Kind (1985)
Ruoktu váimmus (1985) (combination of earlier poem collections)
Ádjaga silbasuonat (1981)
Kevään yöt niin valoisat (1980)
Lávllo vizár biellocizás (1976)
Gida ijat cuov’gadat (1974)

References

External links
Liv Tone Boine reciting Valkeapää's poem Mu ruoktu lea mu váimmus in Northern Sámi

1943 births
2001 deaths
People from Enontekiö
Writers from Lapland (Finland)
Sámi artists
20th-century Finnish male singers
Finnish Sámi people
Finnish writers
Finnish Sámi-language writers
Finnish Sámi musicians
Finnish expatriates in Norway
Nordic Council Literature Prize winners
20th-century Finnish painters
20th-century Finnish poets
Finnish male poets
20th-century Finnish male writers
Bisexual poets
Finnish LGBT singers
Finnish LGBT poets
Bisexual singers
Recipients of the Order of the White Star, 5th Class
Finnish male painters
20th-century LGBT people
20th-century Finnish male artists
LGBT Sámi people